"Groupie" is a song by Swedish duo Samir & Viktor. The song was released in Sweden as a digital download on 14 February 2015. The song took part in Melodifestivalen 2015 and qualified to Andra Chansen (Second Chance) round through the second semi-final on 14 February 2015. In the Andra Chansen round on 7 March 2015, the song managed to qualify to the Melodifestivalen final, defeating "Det rår vi inte för" by Behrang Miri featuring Victor Crone. The song finished 8th in the final.

Track listing

Charts

Weekly charts

Year-end charts

Certifications

Release history

References

2015 songs
2015 singles
Melodifestivalen songs of 2015
Swedish-language songs
Swedish pop songs
Songs written by Anton Hård af Segerstad
Warner Music Group singles
Samir & Viktor songs